Starflyer or Star Flyer may refer to:

 StarFlyer, a Japanese airline
 Star Flyer, a sailing ship operated by Star Clippers of Sweden
 Starflyer 59, an indie rock/shoegaze band from Riverside, California
 The Starflyer, an alien antagonist in Peter F. Hamilton's Commonwealth Saga
 Starflyers, a computer edutainment series of games released by The Learning Company

Amusement rides 
 Star Flyer (ride), produced by Australian manufacturer Funtime
 Star Flyer (roller coaster), a Pinfari manufactured ride in Star City in Pasay, Metro Manila, Philippines.
 Star Flyer (Tivoli Gardens), a Funtime-manufactured ride in Copenhagen, Denmark
 Texas Star Flyer, a Funtime-manufactured ride at Galveston Island Historic Pleasure Pier, US